Le Pellerin is a commune in the Loire-Atlantique department in western France.

Population

Personalities
Le Pellerin was the birthplace (21 May 1759) of Joseph Fouché.

See also
Communes of the Loire-Atlantique department

References

Communes of Loire-Atlantique